Unua, or Onua, is an Oceanic language spoken in south-east Malekula, Vanuatu. It is said to be a dialect of the same language, Unua-Pangkumu, as Rerep (Pangkumu).

Phonology
The following table lists the contrastive consonant sounds of Unua. There are 16 consonant phonemes for younger Unua speakers and an additional three contrastive velarized labial consonants for older speakers, shown below in parentheses. 

The following table lists the contrastive vowel sounds of Unua. Younger speakers have five vowel phonemes and older speakers have an additional three, shown in parentheses.

Grammar

Unua has SVO ordering.

References

Malekula languages
Languages of Vanuatu